In cooperative game theory and social choice theory, the Nakamura number measures the degree of rationality
of preference aggregation rules (collective decision rules), such as voting rules.
It is an indicator of the extent to which an aggregation rule can yield well-defined choices.
If the number of alternatives (candidates; options) to choose from is less than this number, then the rule in question will identify "best" alternatives without any problem.
In contrast,
The larger the Nakamura number a rule has, the greater the number of alternatives the rule can rationally deal with.
For example, since (except in the case of four individuals (voters)) the Nakamura number of majority rule is three,
the rule can deal with up to two alternatives rationally (without causing a paradox).
The number is named after  (1947–1979), a Japanese game theorist who proved the above fact
that the rationality of collective choice critically depends on the number of alternatives.

Overview
To introduce a precise definition of the Nakamura number, we give an example of a "game" (underlying the rule in question)
to which a Nakamura number will be assigned.
Suppose the set of individuals consists of individuals 1, 2, 3, 4, and 5.  
Behind majority rule is the following collection of ("decisive") coalitions (subsets of individuals) having at least three members:
 { {1,2,3}, {1,2,4}, {1,2,5}, {1,3,4}, {1,3,5}, {1,4,5}, {2,3,4}, {2,3,5}, {2,4,5}, {3,4,5}, {1,2,3,4}, {1,2,3,5}, {1,2,4,5}, {1,3,4,5}, {2,3,4,5}, {1,2,3,4,5} }
A Nakamura number can be assigned to such collections, which we call simple games.
More precisely, a simple game is just an arbitrary collection of coalitions;
the coalitions belonging to the collection are said to be winning; the others losing.
If all the (at least three, in the example above) members of a winning coalition prefer alternative x to alternative y,
then the society (of five individuals, in the example above) will adopt the same ranking (social preference).

The Nakamura number of a simple game is defined as the minimum number of winning coalitions with empty intersection.
(By intersecting this number of winning coalitions, one can sometimes obtain an empty set.
But by intersecting less than this number, one can never obtain an empty set.)
The Nakamura number of the simple game above is three, for example, 
since the intersection of any two winning coalitions contains at least one individual

Nakamura's theorem (1979) gives the following necessary (also sufficient if the set of alternatives is finite) condition for a simple game to have a nonempty "core" (the set of socially "best" alternatives) for all profiles of individual preferences:
the number of alternatives is less than the Nakamura number of the simple game.
Here, the core of a simple game with respect to the profile of preferences is the set of all alternatives  
such that there is no alternative 
For the majority game example above, the theorem implies that the core will be empty (no alternative will be deemed "best") for some profile,
if there are three or more alternatives.

Variants of Nakamura's theorem exist that provide a condition for the core to be nonempty 
(i) for all profiles of acyclic preferences;
(ii) for all profiles of transitive preferences; and 
(iii) for all profiles of linear orders.
There is a different kind of variant (Kumabe and Mihara, 2011),
which dispenses with acyclicity, the weak requirement of rationality.
The variant gives a condition for the core to be nonempty for all profiles of preferences that have maximal elements.

For ranking alternatives, there is a very well known result called "Arrow's impossibility theorem" in social choice theory, 
which points out the difficulty for a group of individuals in ranking three or more alternatives.
For choosing from a set of alternatives (instead of ranking them), Nakamura's theorem is more relevant.
An interesting question is how large the Nakamura number can be.
It has been shown that for a (finite or) algorithmically computable simple game that has no veto player 
(an individual that belongs to every winning coalition)
to have a Nakamura number greater than three, the game has to be non-strong.
This means that there is a losing (i.e., not winning) coalition whose complement is also losing.
This in turn implies that nonemptyness of the core is assured for a set of three or more alternatives
only if the core may contain several alternatives that cannot be strictly ranked.

Framework
Let  be a (finite or infinite) nonempty set of individuals.
A simple game (voting game) is a collection  of coalitions.
(Equivalently, it is a coalitional game that assigns either 1 or 0 to each coalition.)
We assume that  is nonempty and does not contain an empty set.
A simple game  is monotonic if  and 
imply .  
It is proper if  implies .
It is strong if  implies .
A veto player (vetoer) is an individual that belongs to all winning coalitions.
A simple game is nonweak if it has no veto player.
It is finite if there is a finite set (called a carrier)  such that for all coalitions , 
we have  iff .

Let  be a (finite or infinite) set of alternatives, whose cardinal number (the number of elements) 
 is at least two.
A (strict) preference is an asymmetric relation  on :
if  (read " is preferred to "), 
then .
We say that a preference  is acyclic (does not contain cycles) if 
for any finite number of alternatives , 
we have .  Note that acyclic relations are asymmetric, hence preferences.

A profile is a list  of individual preferences .
Here  means that individual  prefers alternative 

A simple game with ordinal preferences is a pair  consisting
of a simple game  and a profile .
Given , a dominance (social preference) relation  is defined 
satisfying  for all .
 if and only if there is no  such that .

Definition and examples 
The Nakamura number  of a simple game  is the size (cardinal number)
of the smallest collection of winning coalitions with empty intersection:

if  (no veto player); 
otherwise,  (greater than any cardinal number).

it is easy to prove that if  is a simple game without a veto player, then .

Examples for finitely many individuals (see Austen-Smith and Banks (1999), Lemma 3.2).
Let  be a simple game that is monotonic and proper.
If  is strong and without a veto player, then .
If  is the majority game (i.e., a coalition is winning if and only if it consists of more than half of individuals), then  if ;  if .

Examples for at most countably many individuals.
Kumabe and Mihara (2008) comprehensively study the restrictions that various properties 
(monotonicity, properness, strongness, nonweakness, and finiteness) for simple games 
impose on their Nakamura number (the Table "Possible Nakamura Numbers" below summarizes the results).  
In particular, they show that an algorithmically computable simple
game 
without a veto player has a Nakamura number greater than 3 only if it is proper and nonstrong.

Nakamura's theorem for acyclic preferences 

Nakamura's theorem (Nakamura, 1979, Theorems 2.3 and 2.5).
Let  be a simple game.

Remarks

Nakamura's theorem is often cited in the following form, without reference to the core (e.g., Austen-Smith and Banks, 1999, Theorem 3.2): The dominance relation  is acyclic for all profiles  of acyclic preferences if and only if  for all finite  (Nakamura 1979, Theorem 3.1).
The statement of the theorem remains valid if we replace "for all profiles  of acyclic preferences" by "for all profiles  of negatively transitive preferences" or by "for all profiles  of linearly ordered (i.e., transitive and total) preferences".

The theorem can be extended to -simple games. Profiles are suitably restricted to measurable ones: a profile  is measurable if for all , we have .

A variant of Nakamura's theorem for preferences that may contain cycles 
In this section, we discard the usual assumption of acyclic preferences.
Instead, we restrict preferences to those having a maximal element on a given agenda (opportunity set that a group of individuals are confronted with), 
a subset of some underlying set of alternatives.
(This weak restriction on preferences might be of some interest from the viewpoint of behavioral economics.)
An alternative  is a maximal element with respect to 
(i.e.,  has a maximal element ) if there is no  such that .  If a preference is acyclic over the underlying set of alternatives, then it has a maximal element on every finite subset .

We introduce a strengthening of the core before stating the variant of Nakamura's theorem.
An alternative  can be in the core  even if there is a winning coalition of individuals  that are "dissatisfied" with  
The following solution excludes such an :
An alternative  is in the core  without majority dissatisfaction if there is no winning coalition  such that for all ,  is non-maximal (there exists some  satisfying ).
It is easy to prove that  depends only on the set of maximal elements of each individual and is included in the union of such sets.
Moreover, for each profile , we have .

A variant of Nakamura's theorem (Kumabe and Mihara, 2011, Theorem 2).
Let  be a simple game.  Then the following three statements are equivalent:
;
the core  without majority dissatisfaction is nonempty for all profiles  of preferences that have a maximal element;
the core  is nonempty for all profiles  of preferences that have a maximal element.

Remarks

Even if an agenda  has infinitely many alternatives, there is an element in the cores for appropriate profiles, as long as the inequality  is satisfied.
The statement of the theorem remains valid if we replace "for all profiles  of preferences that have a maximal element" in statements 2 and 3 by "for all profiles  of preferences that have exactly one maximal element" or "for all profiles  of linearly ordered preferences that have a maximal element" (Kumabe and Mihara, 2011, Proposition 1).
Like Nakamura's theorem for acyclic preferences, this theorem can be extended to -simple games.  The theorem can be extended even further  (1 and 2 are equivalent; they imply 3) to collections  of winning sets by extending the notion of the Nakamura number.

See also 
Gibbard–Satterthwaite theorem
May's theorem
Voting paradox

Notes

Social choice theory
Voting theory
Cooperative games
Economics theorems